Llallawa (Aymara for a monstrous potato (like two potatoes) or animal, Hispanicized spelling Llallahua) is a  mountain in the Andes of Bolivia. It is situated in the La Paz Department, José Manuel Pando Province, Santiago de Machaca Municipality. Llallawa lies north of Payrumani and northeast of Llallawa Nasa (Llallaguanasa). It is situated at one of the affluents of the Payrumani River.

References 

Mountains of La Paz Department (Bolivia)